Glover's Island (originally called Petersham Ait) is in a tree-lined section of river, formerly known as Horse Reach on the tidal Thames, between Richmond Lock and Teddington Lock in the Borough of Richmond upon Thames, London, England.

Description

19th century brinkmanship and the view from Richmond Hill

In 1872 the island, then called Petersham Ait, was bought by a Richmond-based waterman named Joseph Glover for £70; advertising it for resale in 1895. Sir John Whittaker Ellis, Mayor of Richmond, had a house along the aristocratic row on the place with the highest, definitive Thames Arcadia view. This is on the steep terrace of Richmond Hill above public pleasure gardens and he declined to buy the island at £5,000 so suggested that the Richmond Corporation should be approached. The view itself had been painted by John Wootton in about 1740 as A View From Richmond Hill. An English Arcadia.

The Amenities Committee considered the proposal on 2 April 1895 and decided – 
"That while the Committee think it desirable that the Island should be acquired for the Corporation if it could be obtained at a reasonable price, they are of the opinion that in view of the sum now named, it would be useless to enter into any negotiation for its purchase."
Trying again in 1898, Glover caused furore by putting the isle up for auction and suggesting it could be sold to Pears soap to erect a giant advertising hoarding.

Glover used this threat to vex the corporation, offering it to them for £4,000 but although the corporation wanted to buy the island, it was felt that there was no justification in spending such a large sum of money out of its funds.

There then followed a lengthy debate and correspondence in the local press about preserving the view from Richmond Hill and suggestions were made that the purchase should be funded jointly by public subscription and the corporation.

By September, only £50 had been given to the public fund; disclosure of Glover's purchase at £70 did not help.

The auction took place on 21 September but the highest bid was only £200. An unnamed resident had offered Glover £1,000 for the island (which he then intended to present to the corporation), but Glover refused to sell.

In 1900 Max Waechter of Terrace House, Richmond Hill, bought it for £1,600 and conveyed it to the council having that body covenant, with intent to bind its successors, it was never to be developed.

See also
Islands in the River Thames

References

Sources
"Richmond Libraries’ Local Studies Collection"

Geography of the London Borough of Richmond upon Thames
Islands of London
Islands of the River Thames